The sixth season of the American drama television series 24, also known as Day 6, premiered in the United States on Fox on January 14, 2007, and concluded on May 21, 2007. The season's storyline begins and ends at 6:00 a.m. It is set 20 months after the events of the previous season.

Season overview
The sixth season is set 20 months after season five. Over the last 11 weeks before Day 6, the United States has been targeted coast-to-coast in a series of suicide bombings. A man named Abu Fayed agrees to give the U.S. the location of Hamri Al-Assad, the supposed terrorist mastermind of these attacks, in exchange for former CTU Agent Jack Bauer with whom he has a personal grudge. As a result, President Wayne Palmer has negotiated the release of Bauer, who was illegally captured by Chinese government agents, under "high-price" terms.

Season 6 can be divided into two main acts:
 Jack is released from the Chinese prison, and works with CTU to take down suitcase nuke-armed terrorists, and discovers links to his own family in the process.
 After the nukes are recovered, the Chinese manipulate Jack into giving them one of the circuit boards, elevating tensions between the United States and Russia.

Major subplots
 Karen Hayes clashes with Tom Lennox over the ethics of suspending civil liberties for Muslim Americans.
 Corrupt members of Wayne Palmer's administration attempt to have him killed so that they can take more extreme measures to find the nukes.
 Jack discovers that his father and brother both conspired with Charles Logan during the nerve gas crisis.
 Milo Pressman develops feelings for his boss Nadia Yassir and becomes alarmed at the way CTU agent Mike Doyle treats her.
 Morris O'Brian struggles with the guilt he feels over giving Fayed a working detonator and almost relapses into alcoholism.
 Jack becomes attached to his nephew Josh and insists that losing him as collateral damage is not acceptable.
 Jack struggles with the fact that Audrey has been tortured by the Chinese and will need long term care.

Summary
Agent Bauer, having been taken prisoner by China 20 months earlier, is released under a deal arranged by President Wayne Palmer. Jack is immediately asked to sacrifice himself to Abu Fayed, who has offered CTU Hamri Al-Assad, who is believed to be the terrorist mastermind behind the suicide bombings of the last 11 weeks. Jack finds out, however, that Assad is actually trying to stop the attacks, which were orchestrated by Fayed. Jack escapes and saves Assad, which requires him to kill Curtis Manning who is bent on revenge for an earlier incident. Having found out that Fayed is planning to detonate five suitcase nuclear bombs, CTU agents attempt to retrieve one of them but they are too late. While crying over the loss of his friend Curtis, Jack watches in horror as a nuclear blast destroys Valencia.

Jack discovers that his father Phillip and brother Graem are working against CTU and have been for some time. This reunites Jack with his nephew Josh Bauer and sister-in-law Marilyn Bauer who tells him that Audrey Raines is dead. Morris O'Brian is lured out of CTU, captured by Fayed and forced to arm the remaining nuclear bombs. After defusing one of them, Jack is aided by former President Charles Logan. Logan claims that his connection with the Russian Consulate General, Anatoly Markov can help Jack find Dmitri Gredenko, a former Russian general planning to arm RQ-2 Aerial Drones with the bombs to attack the U.S. Dissatisfied with Wayne Palmer's leadership during the crisis, Reed Pollock and a co-conspirator named Carson plan to assassinate Palmer and frame Al-Assad for it. Before Tom Lennox can prevent the attack, their bomb explodes, killing Assad and leaving Palmer in critical condition.

Vice President Noah Daniels assumes executive powers and threatens retaliation. Logan fails to blackmail Markov into giving up Gredenko, so Jack breaks into the Russian Consulate and tortures information out of him. President Logan convinces his ex-wife Martha to call the Russian First Lady, Anya Suvarov. As a result, Yuri Suvarov authorizes action against the consulate by a CTU team (led by new Director of Field Operations Mike Doyle). Jack immediately gives CTU Gredenko's location, but it is too late, as Gredenko has already launched a drone toward San Francisco. Jack manages to locate the drone's pilot and crash land the drone, but radiation is released during the crash. Noah Daniels authorizes a nuclear strike against the Middle-East, but Wayne Palmer is brought out of his coma to intervene.

Gredenko is captured by CTU and he agrees to help bring in Fayed in exchange for amnesty, but warns Fayed instead. Gredenko dies and Jack manages to track down Fayed. After a struggle, Jack single-handedly kills Fayed and finds the two remaining bombs. Jack then receives a phone call from Audrey, who is apparently still alive and is then turned over to Cheng Zhi. Cheng demands a Russian circuit board from one of the nukes, information that could start a war, in exchange for Audrey's freedom. President Palmer reluctantly authorizes Jack's plan but collapses during a press conference, allowing Daniels to assume executive duties and reverse the order. Jack goes rogue and goes through with the exchange, learning that Audrey has endured pharmaceutical torture. His plan to destroy the board fails and Cheng gets hold of it.

Russia discovers that the Chinese have the circuit board and threatens military action. Cheng discovers that the board has been damaged and calls Phillip Bauer to fix it. Jack gets a lead from Audrey about Cheng's location but before they can use it, CTU is infiltrated by Chinese mercenaries, led by Zhou, and most members of CTU are taken hostage.
Milo is fatally shot when he steps up to protect Nadia. Jack Bauer, Mike Doyle and others are able to kill the mercenaries and they learn that one of Phillip Bauer's conditions for helping the Chinese was that his grandson Josh be delivered to him. Phillip Bauer calls the White House and offers to give the circuit board for Josh, and they agree. Doyle takes Josh from Jack to go ahead with the exchange.

Jack finds out about the deal and gets help from Bill Buchanan, who had been fired from CTU earlier after the Department of Justice needed a fall guy for the escape of Abu Fayed. The exchange fails as Jack predicted and Phillip Bauer manages to capture Josh on an offshore oil rig while still in possession of the circuit board. Daniels decides to launch an air strike against the oil rig but Jack and Bill commandeer a helicopter in order to save Josh. They arrive in time to kill Cheng's men, capture Cheng alive and rescue Josh. Phillip Bauer dies in the subsequent airstrike. Jack confronts Audrey's father, James Heller, by whom he feels abandoned and lashes out. Heller apologizes, but convinces Jack that Audrey would be safer without him. Jack tells a sleeping Audrey that even though he loves her, he must let her go for her own sake. He walks outside to a cliff and stares off at the ocean at an uncertain future.

Characters

Starring
 Kiefer Sutherland as Jack Bauer (24 episodes)
 Mary Lynn Rajskub as Chloe O'Brian (24 episodes)
 D. B. Woodside as President Wayne Palmer (17 episodes)
 James Morrison as Bill Buchanan (21 episodes)
 Peter MacNicol as Tom Lennox (24 episodes)
 Jayne Atkinson as Karen Hayes (18 episodes)
 Carlo Rota as Morris O'Brian (24 episodes)
 Eric Balfour as Milo Pressman (19 episodes)
 Marisol Nichols as Nadia Yassir (24 episodes)
 Regina King as Sandra Palmer (9 episodes)

Special guest stars
 Powers Boothe as Vice President Noah Daniels (14 episodes)
 James Cromwell as Phillip Bauer (8 episodes)
 Kim Raver as Audrey Raines (5 episodes)
 Gregory Itzin as Charles Logan (4 episodes)
 William Devane as James Heller (2 episodes)
 Jean Smart as Martha Logan (1 episode)

Guest starring

Episodes

Production
A shocking twist from the fourth episode was the detonation of a suitcase nuke that killed twelve thousand civilians. The subsequent episodes, however, hardly showed any of the panic that would result from this. David Fury explained the development by saying that the intended writing direction kept fluctuating. "In the early seasons of 24, [the writers tried] to map out stories and arc out stories [beforehand] a little bit more than they did, say, in seasons four and five, and four and five turned out to be two of most successful seasons." The nuclear threat was defused before the end of the season, leading to a story that was more personal for Jack. A panel of writers at Comic-Con said that they originally planned for Tony Almeida to return in the sixth-season finale.

A ten-minute prequel to the sixth season of 24 is available on the Region-1 version of the Season 5 DVD. The clip begins seven months after Day 5 and shows the Chinese torturing Jack trying to learn the identity of a double agent in their ranks. What appear to be American covert-ops soldiers break into the complex and free Jack, bringing him to a Chinese man named Hong Wai. As Jack flinches in recognition of Hong, the Chinese show up and thank Jack for identifying the double agent they had suspected all along. Cheng Zhi then executes Hong.

Additionally, an epilogue to Season 6 was released called 24: Debrief. It was first made available to American Express cardholders but was later released on the Season 6 DVD.

Trailer
The original trailer for the sixth season opens with Kiefer Sutherland breaking the fourth wall and thanking the fans. The trailer features scenes from the first four episodes and sets Jack Bauer up to be sacrificed. It was released on October 24, 2006.

Casting
Eddie Izzard was cast as Darren McCarthy but left the show after one day of filming. According to Izzard, producers wanted to option further dates, but he was unavailable due to working on The Riches. He was replaced by David Hunt.

Reception
On Rotten Tomatoes, the season has an approval rating of 74% with an average score of 7.9 out of 10 based on 31 reviews. The website's critical consensus reads, "24s sixth day still delivers the goods on the action front, but this season's attempt to introduce Jack Bauer's familial angst into proceedings feels more contrived than inspired."

Some members of the production staff cite Season 6 as their most disappointing season. In a 2010 interview, Howard Gordon said "I feel as though the story made a very wrong turn in season 6". Also, when speaking about Season 7, Kiefer Sutherland said "We hit a couple rough spots with a lot of our viewers in Season 6, and we really wanted to remedy that". Nevertheless, the season received many positive reviews, and holds a Metacritic score of 79 out of 100. For this season, Jean Smart received the Emmy nomination for Outstanding Guest Actress in a Drama Series and Kiefer Sutherland received his sixth nomination for Outstanding Lead Actor in a Drama Series.

Award nominations

Home media releases

References

External links
 

24 (TV series)
2007 American television seasons